Dochahi (also Romanized as Dochāhī) is a village in Howmeh Rural District, in the Central District of Kahnuj County, Kerman Province, Iran. At the 2006 census, its population was 231, which was composed of 50 families.

References 

Populated places in Kahnuj County